Durankulak is a prehistoric archaeological site on the Golemija ostrov (Big Island) in Durankulak lake, Bulgaria. Prehistoric settlement commenced on the small island approximately 7000 BP and lasted for thousands of years.

The first inhabitants were the Hamangia culture, dated from the middle of the 6th millennium to the middle of 5th millennium BC, and were the first manifestation of the Neolithic life in Dobrudja. Hamangia people were small-scale cultivators and plant collectors who built houses, made pottery, herded and hunted animals. Around 4700/4600 BC the stone architecture was already in general use and became a characteristic phenomenon that was unique in Europe. The settlement in Durankulak was a well-organized aggregation of buildings of substantial size with several rooms. They were coherently laid out according to a plan that was repeated over successive generations of house reconstructions. Buildings were rectilinear and large, narrow paths separated individual houses, which stood alone or abutted by other buildings. The structures were robust and made of large wooden posts sunk into foundation trenches and joined with wooden planks or branches covered with mud or clay. In all building horizons, except for in the earliest ones, buildings were internally divided into separate, mainly rectilinear, rooms.
Stone structures and bases from the houses are well preserved and there is a cave and some cisterns to see. Durankulak is one of few monuments left from early farming societies in Europe and tell us about daily life.
The excavation in Durankulak took part between 1974 and 1997 when 1204 prehistoric burials were carefully recorded and the remains of 21 houses were found.

The name is of ancient origin meaning the place where the taurus knocked with his fist (hoof) and gushed water surrounded the two isles in the lake. Its like a legend of the chosen land for ever giving life and prosperity. The barelefs and golden  
ornamentations of tauruses were found in Thracian tombs, Roman burial barelefs and in Varna Necropolis

See also
 List of ancient cities in Thrace and Dacia
 Karanovo culture
 Perperikon
 Seuthopolis
 Solnitsata
 Tell Yunatsite

References

1974 archaeological discoveries
Prehistoric sites in Bulgaria
Neolithic sites of Europe
Chalcolithic sites of Europe
Populated places established in the 6th millennium BC